David Schad Ward (born October 25, 1945) is an American screenwriter and film director. He was nominated for two Academy Awards for his screenplays for the films The Sting (1973) and Sleepless in Seattle (1993), winning for the former. He was also nominated for a British Academy Film Award, a Golden Globe Award, and two Writers Guild of America Awards.

Life and early career
Ward was born in Providence, Rhode Island, the son of Miriam (née Schad) and Robert McCollum Ward. Ward has degrees from Pomona College (BA), as well as both USC and the UCLA Film School (MFA).

He was employed at an educational film production company when he sold his screenplay for The Sting (1973), which led to an Oscar win for Best Original Screenplay. After this initial success, his follow-up projects were less critically and commercially well received, including Ward's first directorial effort, Cannery Row (1982), and a sequel The Sting II (1983). Ward's efforts to sell a script based on the frontier days of California were undone by an industry-wide "ban" on Westerns after the spectacular failure of Michael Cimino's Heaven's Gate (1980). He then wrote the comedy Saving Grace (1986) under a pseudonym.

Comeback and Major League
Sting star Robert Redford contracted Ward in 1986 to work on the Redford-directed The Milagro Beanfield War. The response to this project enabled Ward to convince Morgan Creek Productions and Mirage Productions to bankroll Major League (1989), a baseball comedy that he'd been pitching to producers without success since 1982. Major League was a labor of love for Ward, who had lived in the Cleveland suburb of South Euclid as a child and who had rooted for the Indians' teams of the 1950s, including the 1954 American League Champions. "I figured the only way they were ever going to win anything in my lifetime was to do a movie and they'd win", says Ward.  Within 10 years of the film's release, the Indians would appear in the World Series twice, then again in 2016.

Major League and Ward's subsequent efforts as a writer and director, King Ralph (1991) and Major League II (1994), were about underdogs who triumphed over the gadflies and nay-sayers of the world. He later scored a box-office coup with his screenplay (in collaboration with Nora Ephron) for 1993's Sleepless in Seattle. He went back to the well, directing the sequel Major League II, and then moved on to the Naval comedy Down Periscope (1996) starring Kelsey Grammer. He also did uncredited rewrites on The Mask of Zorro (1998)

Teaching and present career
Ward currently is a professor at Chapman University, in southern California, where he teaches screenwriting and directing, and acts as a Filmmaker in Residence for the campus.

Another ten years would pass before Ward was credited on another film, Flyboys, a 2006 World War I drama starring James Franco directed by Tony Bill (who was a producer on The Sting). In 2010 it was announced that there would be a Major League 4, starring many of the same cast as the previous films. As of late 2012, the script for the film is reportedly finished, but the film is still in pre-production.

Filmography

Feature films

Short films

References

External links
 
 Platt, Ben MLB.com, "Popularity of 'Major League' remains", 7 April 2009

1945 births
American film directors
American male screenwriters
Best Original Screenplay Academy Award winners
Chapman University faculty
Living people
Writers from Providence, Rhode Island
Pomona College alumni
UCLA Film School alumni
USC School of Cinematic Arts alumni
Screenwriters from California
Screenwriters from Rhode Island